Lod is a city in Israel.

Lod, LOD and LoD may also refer to:

 Legal Operations Detachment; see United States Army Reserve Legal Command
 Legion of Doom (disambiguation), multiple uses
 Length of day
 Letter of demand (of payment), an instrument in debt collection
 Line of dance in Ballroom
 Line of defense in security
 Last order date, a milestone in Product Life Cycle

Science and technology

 Length on deck, a measurement of a ship over the deck from forward deck to the transom
 LOD, the length of a mean solar day in a uniform time scale such as International Atomic Time; see ΔT
 Limit of detection
 LOD score, logarithm of odds
 Loss on drying
 Level of Development or Level of Detail, in Building information modeling

Computing

 Law of Demeter, a design guideline for developing software
 Level of detail, a computer graphics technique to adapt the detail of the displayed 3D object to the user needs
 Linked open data, using web technologies to link open data
 Leading-one detector, a logic circuit used in computer arithmetic

Places

 The Lod, a river in West Sussex, England
 Lod airport, a former name of Ben Gurion Airport, Israel
 Lodi, Lombardy
 Province of Lodi, in Italy
 Lod (crater), a crater in the Oxia Palus quadrangle of Mars

Entertainment

 Legacy of Darkness (disambiguation), multiple uses
 The Legend of Dragoon, a PlayStation role-playing game
 Line of Duty, British police procedural television series
 Diablo II: Lord of Destruction, an official expansion to the computer game Diablo II
 L.O.D. (EP), an EP by the American rapper Desiigner

See also
 Ice (Dukaj novel) (original title: Lód), a 2007 novel by Jacek Dukaj